Kelso Township may refer to the following places in the United States:
 Kelso Township, Dearborn County, Indiana
  Kelso Township, Sibley County, Minnesota
  Kelso Township, Scott County, Missouri
  Kelso Township, Traill County, North Dakota